The 1956 London Heathrow Avro Vulcan crash was a military aviation accident that occurred at Heathrow Airport on 1 October 1956 when Avro Vulcan B.1 XA897 crashed while attempting to land in poor weather. The captain and co-pilot ejected safely but the remaining four crew were killed.

Background
XA897 was the first Vulcan bomber delivered to the Royal Air Force; after arriving at RAF Waddington, the aircraft was loaned to C-in-C Air Marshal Sir Harry Broadhurst and Squadron Leader Donald "Podge" Howard for a  round the world trip to showcase the aircraft's advanced design. Between 9 September and 1 October 1956, XA897 flew to Australia and New Zealand and was accompanied by three Avro Shackletons containing ground-crew and parts to service the Vulcan.

Leaving Australia, the Vulcan flew to RAF Khormaksar in Aden. It took off from there at 02:50 hours GMT and was scheduled to arrive shortly after 10 o'clock in the morning at London Heathrow.

Accident
The Vulcan had been fitted with bomb bay fuel tanks to cover the great distance from Aden and the aircraft approached Heathrow in torrential rain. At the controls were Squadron Leader Howard and the co-pilot was Air Marshal Sir Harry Broadhurst. In the rear of the aircraft were three RAF crewmen and a civilian technical advisor from the Avro company.

However, the crew reduced their height too much, with their air speed close to the minimum drag point for a gear down configuration. As a result, the Vulcan was  short of the runway and the initial contact with the ground removed the aircraft's undercarriage.

The pilot attempted to regain control but was unable to and he and the co-pilot both ejected. The low level made it impossible for Squadron Leader Stroud (Howard's regular co-pilot who was in the aircraft's radar navigator's seat), Squadron Leader Eames, Squadron Leader Gamble, and Frederick Bassett to exit the aircraft and they were killed.

Cause
The court of inquiry convened to review the crash determined that XA897'''s approach was affected by poor visibility due to heavy rain (three Russian Tu-104 aircraft carrying the Bolshoi Ballet had already been diverted away from Heathrow to RAF Manston that morning) and that the aircraft was not equipped to use the instrument landing system (ILS) installed at Heathrow. The approach to Runway 10L was undertaken using a ground controlled approach (GCA) (the first time Howard had done this). Howard attempted to abort the landing  believing he was at  he applied power but his aircraft collided with the ground which removed his undercarriage and severely damaged the Vulcan's control surfaces. The aircraft's port wing was almost vertical and with no prospect of recovery he and Broadhurst ejected. The low level made it impossible for Stroud, Eames, Gamble, and Bassett to exit the aircraft and they were killed.

Later claims of accident cause
In his book The Hidden Truth Maurice Hamlin, a former member of the RAF on duty the day of the crash, claims that Harry Broadhurst ignored three direct orders to divert away from Heathrow due to the poor weather conditions (noting other aircraft had already been diverted). Pilots, he goes on to say, cannot ignore these orders but Hamlin believes that Broadhurst continued to attempt to land due to the waiting press and dignitaries. He further claims a fifty-year D-Notice was placed on the incident (that has now expired).

Timeline
02:50 GMT - XA897 leaves Aden

Notes

Bibliography
 RAF Court of Inquiry into accident involving Vulcan XA897  at London Airport on 1 October 1956 - The National Archives

External links
 "Anniversary of Vulcan crash" BBC News, 19 September 2008.
 Aviation Safety Network accident report
 "Dr. Touch's Report on the Vulcan Accident" a 1957 Flight'' article on the official report

Aviation accidents and incidents in London
Aviation accidents and incidents at Heathrow Airport
Accidents and incidents involving Royal Air Force aircraft
London Heathrow Avro Vulcan crash
Aviation accidents and incidents involving the Avro Vulcan
History of the London Borough of Hillingdon
20th century in Middlesex
Disasters in Middlesex
Heathrow Avro Vulcan crash
London Heathrow Avro Vulcan crash
London Heathrow Avro Vulcan crash